Hermann Linde (7 October 1831, Crossen an der Oder – 11 December 1918, Lübeck) was a German pharmacist and early photographer. He is generally referred to as The Elder to distinguish him from his son, Hermann, who was a painter.

Life and work 
In 1860. he married Katinka Stolle, daughter of the painter, Christian Peter Wilhelm Stolle. They had eight children, including Max Linde, an ophthalmologist and art collector, Heinrich Eduard Linde-Walther, a painter, and Hermann Linde, also a painter, who specialized in Orientalist scenes.

In 1859, he became a member of the Freemasons lodge, "Zum Füllhorn" (cornucopia) and, in 1880, succeeded the politician,  as its Grand Master; holding that office until 1889. During his term, the new  was constructed. He was also active in the  Society for the Promotion of Charitable Activities, and served on the Lübeck  (city council) from 1883 to 1895.

Photography 
As early as 1852, inspired by the work of Louis Daguerre, he built his own camera obscura and experimented with it. It was made out of cardboard, with a magnifying glass, and he prepared the collodion himself, using ammonium iodide and ammoniuam bromide. He received his first actual camera from his employer's younger brother, .

Linde took over full control of the company when Eichmann went to Hamburg in 1858.

His reputation rested primarily on portrait photographs. His clients included members of the Mann family, Emanuel Geibel and Fritz Reuter.

He was the city's most popular photographer for several decades. He retired from the business in 1891, due to increasing competition.

Sources 
 Hermann Linde: Erinnerungen aus meinem Leben. Lübeck, 1915, privately published.
 Stefan Pucks: "Linde, Hermann" in: Biographisches Lexikon für Schleswig-Holstein und Lübeck, Vol.11, Neumünster, 2000, pp.226–227 
 Alexander Bastek, Jan Zimmermann (Eds.): Fotografie in Lübeck 1840–1945. Imhof, Petersberg, 2016

External links 



1831 births
1918 deaths
German photographers
German Freemasons
People from Krosno Odrzańskie
German pharmacists